Midões may refer to:

 Midões (Barcelos), a parish in the municipality of Barcelos, Portugal
 Midões (Tábua), a parish in the municipality of Tábua, Portugal